Pablo Emilio Madero Belden (August 3, 1921 in San Pedro, Coahuila – March 16, 2007 Monterrey, Nuevo León, México) was a Mexican politician. He was the 13th president of the  National Action Party (PAN, 1984–1987) and former presidential candidate who represented both the PAN and the extinct Mexican Democratic Party (in Spanish: Partido Demócrata Mexicano, PDM).

Pablo Emilio Madero Belden was the son of General Emilio Madero González and Mercedes Belden Gutiérrez. He graduated as a chemical engineer from the National Autonomous University of Mexico in 1945 as a Sugar and Oil specialist. Six years earlier, in 1939, he had joined the National Action Party (PAN) on December 6, 1939 as a youth group member, an institution he represented twice in the Chamber of Deputies and presided both locally and nationally before leaving it in the early 1990s. He was Vice-President of the National Transformation Industry Chamber (CANACINTRA) and President of the Glass Producers Association of Latin America, among other charges.

In 1994, he became a presidential candidate of Mexican Democratic Party but he lost with 97,935 votes or 0.28% of the total votes.

Madero Belden was married to Norma Morelos Zaragoza Luquin, with whom he had eight children: Norma Alicia, Pablo, Marcela, Leticia, Mercedes, Mónica, Guillermo and Jorge.

In 2007 Pablo Emilio Madero died at the age of 85, in Monterrey, Nuevo León, México.

References

 Diccionario biográfico del gobierno mexicano, Ed. Fondo de Cultura Económica, Mexico, 1992.

1921 births
2007 deaths
Politicians from San Pedro, Coahuila
Members of the Chamber of Deputies (Mexico)
Candidates in the 1982 Mexican presidential election
Candidates in the 1994 Mexican presidential election
Presidents of the National Action Party (Mexico)
National Autonomous University of Mexico alumni
Mexican Democratic Party politicians
20th-century Mexican politicians